Gosick is a Japanese anime television series based on the light novel series of the same name written by Kazuki Sakuraba, with illustrations by Hinata Takeda. The anime was produced by Bones under the direction of Hitoshi Nanba and script supervision by Mari Okada. The series aired on TV Tokyo between January 8 and July 2, 2011. However, the broadcast of episode 11 and afterward was affected by the 2011 Tōhoku earthquake and tsunami. The series was simulcast by Crunchyroll with English subtitles. The opening theme is "Destin Histoire" by Risa Yoshiki and was released on March 2, 2011. For the first 12 episodes, the ending theme is "Resuscitated Hope" by Lisa Komine and was released on April 27, 2011. From episodes 13–24, the ending theme is "Unity", also by Lisa Komine. Bandai Entertainment had licensed the anime, but later cancelled the release of Gosick. Madman Entertainment have licensed the series in Australia and New Zealand and are releasing subtitled-only DVDs until a dubbed version becomes available. Funimation has licensed the series in North America and released the first half of the series on a Blu-ray and DVD combo pack on May 30, 2017 with an English dub. Following Sony's acquisition of Crunchyroll, the series was moved to Crunchyroll.


Episode list

References

Gosick